Stephen L. Hauser is a professor of the Department of Neurology at the University of California, San Francisco (UCSF). His work specializes on immune mechanisms and multiple sclerosis (MS). He has contributed to the establishment of consortia that have identified more than 50 gene variants that contribute to MS risk.

Research
Hauser is a principal investigator of a multinational effort to identify genetic effects on MS, and part of the team that identified that humoral immune mechanisms are important in the pathogenesis of MS lesions, leading to the development of B-cell based therapies for MS. He has contributed to the establishment of nationwide and international genetics consortia that have identified more than 50 gene variants that contribute to MS risk.

Using comparative genomics between African-American and Caucasian MS populations, Hauser's group was able to identify HLA-DRB1 as the primary MS signal in the MHC, and also fine map other secondary loci in this region.

In 2007, as a senior organizer of the International Multiple Sclerosis Genetics Consortium (IMSGC), he helped identify the first two non-HLA genes involved in MS susceptibility, IL-2R (CD25) and IL-7R (CD127).

In 2010, his laboratory published the complete genome sequences and the epigenome of identical twins discordant for MS. By mid-2011 more than fifty MS-associated risk alleles were identified, and by now nearly the entire array of common variants associated with MS susceptibility have been mapped.

Hauser also has focused on the role of the B cell and immunoglobulin in the pathogenesis of the disease. He developed and characterized an MS disease model that replicated the core feature of vesicular demyelination previously observed in MS, and demonstrated that this pathology resulted from the synergistic effects of autoreactive T-cells and pathogenic autoantibodies. In 1999 he published work identifying specific myelin reactivity of these autoantibodies deposited in areas of myelin damage in MS brains. 

Hauser has translated this finding into a new potential therapy for MS. He led a large-scale clinical trial with rituximab, a chimeric monoclonal antibody that depletes CD20+ B cells, and demonstrated robust efficacy in relapsing remitting MS. A second trial in primary progressive MS reported in 2009 that rituximab may similarly be effective in patients with primary progressive MS who also have evidence of ongoing inflammatory CNS disease. More recently, a third clinical trial with a fully humanized anti-CD20 monoclonal antibody, ocrelizumab, replicated the results of the rituximab trial in relapsing remitting MS. With the MS Bioscreen project, Hauser has pioneered precision medicine for complex diseases like MS, creating an "actionable digital growth-chart for complex traits"

Service
In 2010 Hauser was appointed to the Presidential Commission for the Study of Bioethical Issues. He is a co-editor of the textbook Harrison's Principles of Internal Medicine and past editor-in-chief of the Annals of Neurology.

Education
Hauser trained in internal medicine at the New York Hospital-Cornell Medical Center, in neurology at the Massachusetts General Hospital (MGH), and in immunology at Harvard Medical School and the Institute Pasteur in Paris, France, and was a faculty member at Harvard Medical School before moving to UCSF.

Awards and honors
Hauser received the 2013 Charcot Award from the Multiple Sclerosis International Federation, the Jacob Javits Neuroscience Investigator Award, and the John Dystel Prize for Multiple Sclerosis Research. In 2011 he delivered the Robert Wartenberg Lecture at the American Academy of Neurology, an honor given for excellence in clinically relevant research.

Hauser is the chair of the Committee on Gulf War and Health Outcomes for the Institute of Medicine and a Fellow of the American Academy of Arts and Sciences and the Association of American Physicians.

References

External links
 Profile by name in Annals of Neurology (247 results), onlinelibrary.wiley.com; accessed April 20, 2015.
 Statement to the House Committee on Veterans' Affairs, archives.democrats.veterans.house.gov; accessed April 20, 2015.
 Committee on Gulf War and Health Outcomes, iom.edu; accessed April 20, 2015.

1949 births
Living people
Harvard Medical School alumni
Members of the National Academy of Medicine
Medical journal editors
Multiple sclerosis
Physicians from New York (state)
Physicians from California
University of California, San Francisco faculty